James M. Robins is an epidemiologist and biostatistician best known for advancing methods for drawing causal inferences from complex observational studies and randomized trials, particularly those in which the treatment varies with time. He is the 2013 recipient of the Nathan Mantel Award for lifetime achievement in statistics and epidemiology, and a recipient of the 2022 Rousseeuw Prize in Statistics, jointly with Miguel Hernán, Eric Tchetgen-Tchetgen, Andrea Rotnitzky and Thomas Richardson.

He graduated in medicine from Washington University in St. Louis in 1976. He is currently Mitchell L. and Robin LaFoley Dong Professor of Epidemiology at Harvard T.H. Chan School of Public Health. He has published over 100 papers in academic journals and is an ISI highly cited researcher.

Biography 
Robins attended Harvard College with the class of 1971, concentrating in mathematics and philosophy. He was elected to Phi Beta Kappa, but did not graduate. He went on to attend Washington University School of Medicine, graduating in 1976, and practiced Occupational Medicine for several years.  While working in occupational medicine, he attended basic courses in applied medical statistics at the Yale School of Public Health, but quickly came to the conclusion that the methodology used at the time was insufficiently rigorous to support causal conclusions.

Research 
In 1986, Robins introduced a new framework for drawing causal inference from observational data. In this and other articles published around the same time, Robins showed that in non-experimental data, exposure is almost always time-dependent, and that standard methods such as regression are therefore almost always biased. This framework is mathematically very closely related to Judea Pearl's graphical framework Non-Parametric Structural Equations Models, which Pearl developed independently shortly thereafter. Pearl's graphical models are a more restricted version of this theory.

In his original paper on causal inference, Robins described two new methods for controlling for confounding bias, which can be applied in the generalized setting of time-dependent exposures: The G-formula and G-Estimation of Structural Nested Models.  Later, he introduced a third class of models, Marginal Structural Models, in which the parameters are estimated using inverse probability of treatment weights.  He has also contributed significantly to the theory of dynamic treatment regimes, which are of high significance in comparative effectiveness research and personalized medicine. Together with Andrea Rotnitzky and other colleagues, in 1994 he introduced doubly robust estimators (derived from the influence functions) for statistical parameters in causal inference and missing data problems. The theory for doubly robust estimators has been highly influential in the field of [causal inference] and has influenced practice in computer science, biostatistics, epidemiology, machine learning, social sciences, and statistics.  In 2008, he also developed the theory of higher-order influence functions for statistical functional estimation with collaborators including Lingling Li, Eric Tchetgen Tchetgen, and Aad van der Vaart.

Selected publications

Notes

References 
 James Robins — Mitchell L. and Robin LaFoley Dong Professor of Epidemiology. Harvard School of Public Health (Accessed 15 March 2008).
 Dr. James M. Robins — Bibliography Harvard School of Public Health (Accessed 15 March 2008).
 Gehrman, Elizabeth (March 23, 2006) James Robins makes statistics tell the truth: Numbers in the service of health. Harvard University Gazette.

American epidemiologists
American statisticians
Year of birth missing (living people)
Harvard School of Public Health faculty
Living people
Washington University School of Medicine alumni
Biostatisticians
Fellows of the American Statistical Association
Harvard College alumni